Kim Keum-Hwa (also Kim Geum-Hwa, ; born June 21, 1982) is a South Korean sabre fencer. She won a total of four medals (two silver and two bronze), as a member of the South Korean fencing team, at the 2006 Asian Games in Doha, Qatar, and at the 2010 Asian Games in Guangzhou, China.

Kim represented South Korea at the 2008 Summer Olympics in Beijing, where she competed in the women's individual sabre event, along with her teammate Lee Shin-Mi. She defeated France's Carole Vergne in the preliminary round of thirty-two, before losing out her next match to China's Tan Xue, with a score of 8–15.

References

External links
Profile – FIE
NBC Olympics Profile

South Korean female fencers
Living people
Olympic fencers of South Korea
Fencers at the 2008 Summer Olympics
Asian Games medalists in fencing
Fencers at the 2006 Asian Games
Fencers at the 2010 Asian Games
1982 births
Asian Games silver medalists for South Korea
Asian Games bronze medalists for South Korea
Medalists at the 2006 Asian Games
Medalists at the 2010 Asian Games
Universiade medalists in fencing
Universiade silver medalists for South Korea
21st-century South Korean women